Private William R. Fox (1837 - June 6, 1888) was an American soldier who fought in the American Civil War. Fox received the country's highest award for bravery during combat, the Medal of Honor, for his action during the Third Battle of Petersburg in Virginia on 2 April 1865. He was honored with the award on 28 March 1879.

Biography
Fox was born in Philadelphia, Pennsylvania in 1837. Fox's trade was that of a bricklayer. He was residing at 517 South 15th Street at the time of his death, after living for some years with his family at 1528 Dean Street in Philadelphia, PA. Fox was residing on Dean Street in 1879 when he was awarded the Medal of Honor.

Military service

Fox enlisted in Company A, 95th Pennsylvania Infantry on September 21, 1861 at Philadelphia, Pennsylvania. He re-enlisted December 27, 1863 in Virginia and was promoted to Corporal on June 1, 1864. He was mustered out at war's end on July 17, 1865.

Medal of Honor citation
Rank and organization: Private, Company A, 95th Pennsylvania Infantry, Place and date: At Petersburg, Va., 2 April 1865, Date of issue: 28 March 1879.

Fox's official Medal of Honor citation reads:

Death and burial

Medal of Honor recipient William R. Fox died June 6, 1888 of intestinal inflammation and was initially buried June 8, 1888 at the now defunct Odd Fellows Cemetery in Philadelphia, Pennsylvania. His remains were removed May 31, 1899 to Hillside Cemetery, Roslyn, Pennsylvania. Burial plot: Section C, lot 527, grave 5, GPS (lat/lon): 40.1221, -75.1384

See also

List of American Civil War Medal of Honor recipients: A–F

References

1837 births
1888 deaths
People of Pennsylvania in the American Civil War
Union Army officers
United States Army Medal of Honor recipients
American Civil War recipients of the Medal of Honor